Chalpu or Chal Pu may refer to:
 Chalpu, Razavi Khorasan